Kevin Bridges: What's the Story? is a British television series in which Scottish comedian Kevin Bridges performs stand-up comedy and talks about the inspirations for his work. The series comprises six episodes and is being shown on BBC One.

Episode list

References

External links

2010s British comedy television series
2012 British television series debuts
2012 British television series endings
British stand-up comedy television series
English-language television shows